Cheikh Amadou Fall (7 February 1946 – 19 June 2008) was a Senegalese basketball player. He competed in the men's tournament at the 1968 Summer Olympics and the 1972 Summer Olympics.

References

1946 births
2008 deaths
Senegalese men's basketball players
Olympic basketball players of Senegal
Basketball players at the 1968 Summer Olympics
Basketball players at the 1972 Summer Olympics
Basketball players from Dakar